Sewickley Academy is a private, independent, coeducation, college-preparatory academy located in Sewickley, Pennsylvania in the United States. The Academy educates 594 students, from pre-kindergarten to twelfth grade. It is a member of the National Association of Independent Schools.

History 
Founded in 1838 as a boys' school by William Nevin and John Champ, Sewickley Academy is the oldest independent school in western Pennsylvania. It was first located in a house owned by Squire John Way, a brick building that still stands on Beaver Road in Sewickley. Boarding students came from several southern states, including Virginia and a few from as far south as New Orleans, Louisiana, arriving by steamboat and railway to study with local day students from the Pittsburgh area.

During its early history, the school went through several iterations, moving four times around the Sewickley area and even briefly closing three times (once during the Civil War, when southern students returned home and a number of the remaining older boys and teachers joined the war effort). In 1865 the school reopened as a day school. Two local girls' primary schools closed in the early 1900s. After integrating these girls into its academic program, the Academy became a co-educational day school when it settled onto its present campus in 1925.

Under the leadership of Headmaster Cliff Nichols (1951 – 1981), the Academy expanded slowly from a neighborhood school into a more regional institution. For much of its history, the Academy had only educated students through Grade 9. At that point, they then left to attend and complete their secondary education at other boarding and day schools in the Pittsburgh area. However, in 1963 Mr. Nichols hired James E. Cavalier. He delegated him to program and build a Senior School (one class year at a time). The first class graduated from this new Senior School in 1966.

Only four years later, on 10 January 1970, a fire destroyed the main building of the Middle School. Soon after this sad event, Mr. Nichols and the Board of Trustees initiated a capital campaign to fund the significant repair and expansion of the main building and add several new buildings. Later, the Academy commissioned a comprehensive Campus Master Plan (1998 - 2000) that further transformed its education facilities, adding an entirely new classroom building for the Middle School, a central library for the Middle and Senior Schools, reconfiguring and reintegrating many other buildings on campus.

In 2013, the school celebrated the 175th anniversary of its 1838 founding and the 50th anniversary of the inception of its Senior School.

In 2021, in response to parent complaints about DEI initiatives, the school fired all of its black administrators and faculty, including its head of school, Kolia O'Connor. The school subsequently settled a federal racial discrimination lawsuit.

Admissions

Demographics

Extracurricular activities

Cum Laude Society 
Sewickley Academy has been a member of the Cum Laude Society since 1966. Faculty members of the Sewickley Academy Cum Laude Society select students from the senior class as candidates for induction into the Sewickley Academy chapter of the Cum Laude Society. These selections are made based on the student's academic achievement record through the end of their junior year. When evaluating candidates for induction, the Cum Laude Society instructs its member chapters to not consider service, athletics, leadership, or other non-academic factors, because it argues that such qualities are recognized in many other contexts. Therefore, the Cum Laude Society recommendation focuses first and foremost on a student's record of academic achievement.

Athletics 
The Sewickley Academy Athletics Program fosters the development of personal and team excellence in student-athletes. Outstanding coaches work with individuals and teams to improve performance and promote character, leadership, and sportsmanship. More than 85 percent of the middle and senior schools' student body participates on at least one athletic team each year, and many students play multiple sports.

The Academy has a no-cut policy, allowing any student to play on any team of his or her choosing. The campus boasts four athletic fields, including a turf field for softball, five tennis courts, two gymnasiums, and a fully-equipped fitness center that supports a total of 22 varsity teams. In the Fall of 2016, the Academy celebrated the opening of the Events Center, which provided brand new locker rooms for Middle and Senior School students, a state-of-the-art training room, a spacious fitness center with core training facilities to expand physical education offerings, an NCAA regulation-sized basketball court that can be divided to simultaneously accommodate two high-school-sized basketball courts, two team meeting rooms with video review capabilities, and an indoor individualized instruction area for baseball, softball, lacrosse, and golf.

Fall
 Boys cross country
 Girls cross country
 Field hockey
 Boys soccer
 Girls soccer
 Girls tennis
 Golf

Winter
 Boys basketball
 Girls basketball
 Boys ice hockey
 Girls ice hockey
 Boys swimming
 Boys diving
 Girls swimming
 Girls diving
 Track

Spring
 Baseball
 Boys lacrosse
 Girls lacrosse
 Softball
 Boys tennis
 Track

Since 1986, the Academy has been a member of the Western Pennsylvania Interscholastic Athletic League (WPIAL) and competes in District 7 of the Pennsylvania Interscholastic Athletic Association (PIAA). The Academy's ice hockey team is a member of the PIHL and the Midwest Prep Hockey League. The Academy has been crowned the MSA Sports Cup Champion for nine of the past 11 years.

Campus 
Sewickley Academy is located approximately 12 miles northwest of Pittsburgh on a single 16-acre campus that includes 60 classrooms, nine science labs, five computer labs, two robotics labs, two libraries (with a total of 33,600 volumes), two student publishing centers, a digital design lab, and a media center.

The campus also has five tennis courts, four athletic fields (including a turf field), two gymnasiums, and a fully-equipped fitness center that supports 22 varsity sports teams.

Student art programs are supported by visual and performing art studios, a ceramics studio, music practice rooms, a black-box theater with seating for approximately 130, Rea Auditorium with 570 seats, and the Campbell Art Gallery. The Academy utilizes two greenhouses and a school garden to create an outdoor classroom and experiential learning center.

Early Childhood, Lower, Middle, and Senior Schools: 315 Academy Avenue, Sewickley, PA 15143

Frick Field: 200 Hazel Lane, Sewickley, PA 15143

Nichols Field: 624 Beaver Road, Sewickley, PA 15143

Notable alumni
Caitlin Clarke (1970) - Stage & screen actress.
Rusty Cundieff (1978) - Film and television director, actor, and writer
Mike Fincke (1985) - Astronaut.
Valerie Gaydos (1984) - Pennsylvania House of Representatives.
David Hollander (1986) - Screenwriter.
Brian Hutchison (1989) - Tony award winning actor.
Rafe Judkins (2001) - Survivor: Guatemala contestant.
John Latta - 1st Lieutenant Governor of Pennsylvania
John Michael - Broadcaster for the Cleveland Cavaliers.
Gregory Nicotero (1981)
James G. Webster (1969) - Professor at Northwestern University

Gallery

References

External links

Private elementary schools in Pennsylvania
Educational institutions established in 1838
Private middle schools in Pennsylvania
Private high schools in Pennsylvania
Schools in Allegheny County, Pennsylvania
Education in Pittsburgh area
1838 establishments in Pennsylvania
Preparatory schools in Pennsylvania